Josemir Lujambio Llanes (born 25 September 1971 in Durazno) is a retired Uruguayan football striker

Club career
Lujambio has played for a total of nineteen different clubs in five different countries in his fifteen-year career to date. 
He started his career at Defensor in 1992. He moved to Bella Vista,  in 1993, before moving to Venezuela in 1994 to play for Maritimo. In 1995, he moved back to Uruguay to play for Sud América and that same year he moved to Argentina to play for Huracán de Corrientes where he stayed until 1997, when he moved to Newell's Old Boys.

A move to Spain followed in 1998 to play for Rayo Vallecano, before moving back to Uruguay in 1999 to play for Peñarol. He then moved to Argentina again this time to play for Belgrano where he stayed until 2001, when he moved to Banfield. In 2005, he once again returned to Argentina to play again for Banfield, and later in 2007 moved to Olimpo.

In 2008, he joined Atlético Tucumán of the Argentine 2nd division where he was part of the squad that won the 2008–09 championship.

International career
Lujambio made five appearances for Uruguay in 1997.

Honours
Atlético Tucumán
Primera B Nacional: 2008–09

External links
 Profile at Tenfield
 BDFA profile

1971 births
Living people
Uruguayan footballers
Uruguay under-20 international footballers
Uruguay international footballers
1997 Copa América players
Uruguayan people of Basque descent
Defensor Sporting players
C.S. Marítimo de Venezuela players
C.A. Bella Vista players
Peñarol players
Association football forwards
Huracán Corrientes footballers
Newell's Old Boys footballers
Segunda División players
Rayo Vallecano players
Club Atlético Belgrano footballers
Club Atlético Banfield footballers
Olimpo footballers
Atlético Tucumán footballers
Querétaro F.C. footballers
Argentine Primera División players
Primera Nacional players
Uruguayan Primera División players
Uruguayan expatriate footballers
Expatriate footballers in Spain
Expatriate footballers in Argentina
Expatriate footballers in Venezuela
Uruguayan expatriate sportspeople in Argentina
Uruguayan expatriate sportspeople in Spain
Uruguayan expatriate sportspeople in Venezuela
Sud América players